Poh Li San (born 1975) is a Singaporean politician and businesswoman. A member of the governing People's Action Party (PAP), she has been the Member of Parliament (MP) representing the Sembawang West division of Sembawang GRC since 2020. She is currently serving as Deputy President of the Singapore Table Tennis Association. 

A recipient of the Singapore Armed Forces Merit Scholarship (Women), Poh was a helicopter pilot in the Republic of Singapore Air Force (RSAF) and the first female aide-de-camp to President S. R. Nathan. After leaving the RSAF in 2010, she joined the Changi Airport Group and rose to the position of Vice President.

Education
Poh attended Dunman High School and Temasek Junior College before graduating from the University of Illinois Urbana–Champaign in 1998 with a Bachelor of Science with highest honours degree in engineering and a Bachelor of Arts with summa cum laude and highest distinction degree in economics. She was awarded the Bronze Tablet for graduating top 3% in her cohort.

Career

Military career
Poh was awarded the Singapore Armed Forces Merit Scholarship (Women) in 1994 and began her military career with the Republic of Singapore Air Force (RSAF) as a helicopter pilot after completing her education. She flew the Super Puma helicopter in 125 Squadron, Sembawang Airbase. Poh was a Search and Rescue pilot and was part of the SAF Humanitarian and Relief mission to Aceh following the Boxing Day Tsunami.

In 2003, Poh assumed the role of Assistant Director of the Future Systems Technology Directorate under the Ministry of Defence (MINDEF) and led the development of the latest technologies and formulated long term force development strategies and new war-fighting concepts for the SAF. In 2005, Poh was made Flight Commander of 125 Squadron, Sembawang Airbase.

In July 2006, Poh was appointed to be the first female aide-de-camp to then President S. R. Nathan. She was responsible for planning and organising state-level visits, meetings, ceremonies, and events.

In May 2010, Poh left the RSAF and attained the rank Major and joined Changi Airport Group.

Post-military career 
Poh started her career in Changi Airport Group as Head, Budget Terminal in May 2010. She was in charge of the operations of the Changi Airport Budget Terminal. From 2012 to 2017, Poh led the planning and development of the new Terminal 4 where many new innovations and technologies were implemented to improve passenger experience and productivity. She is currently the Vice-President of the Terminal 5 planning and is responsible for the planning of specialised airport engineering systems for the new terminal.

Political career 

Poh joined the governing People's Action Party (PAP) as an activist in 2018. She is an active grassroots leader in Sembawang GRC, where she helped Member of Parliament (MP) and Minister for Education Ong Ye Kung in his Meet-the-People Sessions every Monday in his Gambas Ward. She is currently the Deputy Chairman of the PAP Sembawang Branch of Sembawang GRC and sits on the Citizen's Consultative Committee of the ward as Vice-Chairman, under MP and Co-ordinating Minister for Infrastructure and Minister for Transport Khaw Boon Wan. She was then appointed Deputy Chairperson of Sustainability and Environment Government Parliamentary Committee (GPC) in the 14th Parliament of Singapore.

Personal life 
Poh's father was a school teacher and her mother was an accounts clerk. She was born as a Singaporean of Hokkien descent and a Christian by faith.

References

External links
 Poh Li San on Parliament of Singapore

 

Grainger College of Engineering alumni
Dunman High School alumni
Temasek Junior College alumni
Singaporean military personnel
Singaporean people of Hokkien descent
Singaporean women in politics
Living people
1975 births
Members of the Parliament of Singapore